Janakpuri is an affluent neighborhood in the South West district of Delhi, India. It is located near the Delhi Cantonment area and is accessible by road and Delhi Metro West .

Locality
The present geographical structure of the Janakpuri constituency came into existence in 2008 as a part of the implementation of the recommendations of the Delimitation Commission of India constituted in 2002.

The Locality falls under Category 'D' of residential colonies in Delhi alongside other Category 'D' colonies of  National Capital Territory of Delhi.

The main commercial centre is the Janakpuri District Centre which houses various regional offices of companies and firms as well as shops selling food, apparel, handicrafts and jewellery. A "crafts bazaar" within the complex sells handicrafts and home decor items.

Janakpuri is a part of the South West Delhi Lok Sabha constituency along with nine other Vidhan Sabha segments.

The Delhi Metro has three metro stations in Janakpuri ( Dabri Mor-Janak Puri South, Janak Puri East, Janak Puri West), two stations on the blue line and one station on magenta line. Also, Under the third phase, Janak Puri got a new underground station, Dabri Mor metro station near the DDA Park in C2 Area, on the Magenta Line (Janakpuri(W) - Botanical Garden) which has been opened for public on 29 May 2018. This corridor will have the first driverless train in Delhi Metro Network.    Janakpuri West Metro Station has been expanded to accommodate the new Magenta Line. Janakpuri West Metro Station has India's Highest Escalators. It is 15.6 meters high (equivalent to a 5 storey building) and 35.3meters long.  

It is also connected by the Outer Ring Road to parts of Northwest and North Delhi like Rohini, Pitampura, and Wazirabad through elevated corridors. 

The Hari Nagar Bus Depot is located in the vicinity. It is home to renowned schools like St. Francis de Sales School, SS Mota Singh School, Sumermal Jain Public School and Happy Model School along with DU College like Bharti College.

Tihar Jail
The Tihar Central Jail was set up in 1958 on the land of Tihar in Janakpuri. In the beginning, only one Central Jail was commissioned with the lodging capacity of 1273 prisoners. The prison population gradually grew and today as many as 11,000 inmates are lodged here. Tihar CJ is the largest prison complex in Asia. The prison complex has nine central jails apart from a District Jail at Rohini, which was commissioned in 2004.

References

Neighbourhoods in Delhi
South West Delhi district